This page lists all described species of the spider family Halonoproctidae accepted by the World Spider Catalog :

Bothriocyrtum

Bothriocyrtum Simon, 1891
 B. californicum (O. Pickard-Cambridge, 1874) (type) — USA
 B. fabrile Simon, 1891 — Mexico
 B. tractabile Saito, 1933 — Taiwan

Conothele

Conothele Thorell, 1878
Conothele arboricola Pocock, 1899 – Papua New Guinea (New Britain), Australia (Queensland)
Conothele baisha H. Liu, Xu, Zhang, F. Liu & Li, 2019 – China (Hainan)
Conothele baiyunensis X. Xu, C. Xu & Liu, 2017 – China
Conothele baoting H. Liu, Xu, Zhang, F. Liu & Li, 2019 – China (Hainan)
Conothele birmanica Thorell, 1887 – Myanmar
Conothele cambridgei Thorell, 1890 – Indonesia (Sumatra)
Conothele cangshan Yang & Xu, 2018 – China
Conothele chinnarensis Sunil Jose, 2021 – India
Conothele daxinensis X. Xu, C. Xu & Liu, 2017 – China
Conothele deqin Yang & Xu, 2018 – China
Conothele doleschalli Thorell, 1881 – Australia (Queensland)
Conothele ferox Strand, 1913 – New Guinea
Conothele fragaria (Dönitz, 1887) – Japan
Conothele giganticus Siliwal & Raven, 2015 – India
Conothele gressitti (Roewer, 1963) – Micronesia
Conothele hebredisiana Berland, 1938 – Vanuatu
Conothele isan Decae, Schwendinger & Hongpadharakiree, 2021 – Thailand
Conothele jinggangshan H. Liu, Xu, Zhang, F. Liu & Li, 2019 – China
Conothele khunthokhanbi Kananbala, Bhubaneshwari & Siliwal, 2015 – India
Conothele lampra (Chamberlin, 1917) – USA?
Conothele limatior Kulczyński, 1908 – New Guinea
Conothele linzhi H. Liu, Xu, Zhang, F. Liu & Li, 2019 – China
Conothele malayana (Doleschall, 1859) (type) – Indonesia (Moluccas), New Guinea, Australia
Conothele martensi Decae, Schwendinger & Hongpadharakiree, 2021 – Thailand
Conothele medoga Zhang & Yu, 2021 – China
Conothele nigriceps Pocock, 1898 – Solomon Is.
Conothele ogalei Sanap, Pawar, Joglekar & Khandekar, 2022 – India
Conothele sidiechongensis X. Xu, C. Xu & Liu, 2017 – China, Laos
Conothele spinosa Hogg, 1914 – New Guinea
Conothele taiwanensis (Tso, Haupt & Zhu, 2003) – Taiwan
Conothele trachypus Kulczyński, 1908 – Papua New Guinea (New Britain)
Conothele truncicola Saaristo, 2002 – Seychelles
Conothele vali Siliwal, Nair, Molur & Raven, 2009 – India
Conothele varvarti Siliwal, Nair, Molur & Raven, 2009 – India
Conothele yundingensis X. Xu, C. Xu & Liu, 2017 – China

Cyclocosmia

Cyclocosmia Ausserer, 1871
 C. lannaensis Schwendinger, 2005 — China, Thailand
 C. latusicosta Zhu, Zhang & Zhang, 2006 — China, Vietnam
 C. liui Xu, Xu & Li, 2017 — China
 C. loricata (C. L. Koch, 1842) — Mexico
 C. ricketti (Pocock, 1901) — China
 C. siamensis Schwendinger, 2005 — Thailand, Laos
 C. sublatusicosta Yu & Zhang, 2018 — China
 C. subricketti Yu & Zhang, 2018 — China
 C. torreya Gertsch & Platnick, 1975 — USA
 C. truncata (Hentz, 1841) (type) — USA

Hebestatis

Hebestatis Simon, 1903
 H. theveneti (Simon, 1891) (type) — USA

Latouchia

Latouchia Pocock, 1901
Latouchia bachmaensis Ono, 2010 – Vietnam
Latouchia cornuta Song, Qiu & Zheng, 1983 – China
Latouchia cryptica (Simon, 1897) – India
Latouchia cunicularia (Simon, 1886) – Vietnam
Latouchia davidi (Simon, 1886) (type) – China
Latouchia formosensis Kayashima, 1943 – Taiwan
Latouchia f. smithi Tso, Haupt & Zhu, 2003 – Taiwan
Latouchia fossoria Pocock, 1901 – China
Latouchia huberi Decae, 2019 – Vietnam
Latouchia hunanensis Xu, Yin & Bao, 2002 – China
Latouchia hyla Haupt & Shimojana, 2001 – Japan (Ryukyu Is.)
Latouchia incerta Decae, Schwendinger & Hongpadharakiree, 2021 – Thailand
Latouchia japonica Strand, 1910 – Japan
Latouchia kitabensis (Charitonov, 1946) – Central Asia
Latouchia maculosa Decae, Schwendinger & Hongpadharakiree, 2021 – Thailand
Latouchia parameleomene Haupt & Shimojana, 2001 – Japan (Okinawa)
Latouchia pavlovi Schenkel, 1953 – China
Latouchia rufa Zhang & Wang, 2021 – China
Latouchia schwendingeri Decae, 2019 – Vietnam
Latouchia stridulans Decae, 2019 – Vietnam
Latouchia swinhoei Pocock, 1901 – Japan (Ryukyu Is.)
Latouchia typica (Kishida, 1913) – China, Japan
Latouchia vinhiensis Schenkel, 1963 – China
Latouchia wenruni (Lin & Li, 2023) – China (Hainan)
Latouchia yejiei Zhang & Wang, 2021 – China (Hainan)
Latouchia yuanjingae (Lin & Li, 2022) – China (Hainan)

Ummidia

Ummidia Thorell, 1875
 U. absoluta (Gertsch & Mulaik, 1940) — USA
 U. aedificatoria (Westwood, 1840) — Morocco
 U. algarve Decae, 2010 — Portugal
 U. algeriana (Lucas, 1846) — Algeria, Tunisia
 U. armata (Ausserer, 1875) — Unknown
 U. asperula (Simon, 1889) — Venezuela
 U. audouini (Lucas, 1835) — USA
 U. beatula (Gertsch & Mulaik, 1940) — USA
 U. carabivora (Atkinson, 1886) — USA
 U. c. emarginata (Atkinson, 1886) — USA
 U. celsa (Gertsch & Mulaik, 1940) — USA
 U. erema (Chamberlin, 1925) — Panama
 U. ferghanensis (Kroneberg, 1875) — Central Asia
 U. funerea (Gertsch, 1936) — USA
 U. gandjinoi (Andreeva, 1968) — Tajikistan
 U. glabra (Doleschall, 1871) — Brazil
 U. mischi Zonstein, 2014 — Afghanistan
 U. modesta (Banks, 1901) — USA
 U. nidulans (Fabricius, 1787) — Caribbean
 U. oaxacana (Chamberlin, 1925) — Mexico
 U. picea Thorell, 1875 (type) — Spain
 U. pustulosa (Becker, 1879) — Mexico
 U. pygmaea (Chamberlin & Ivie, 1945) — USA
 U. rugosa (Karsch, 1880) — Costa Rica, Panama
 U. salebrosa (Simon, 1892) — St. Vincent
 U. tuobita (Chamberlin, 1917) — USA
 U. zebrina (F. O. Pickard-Cambridge, 1897) — Mexico, Guatemala
 U. zilchi Kraus, 1955 — Mexico, El Salvador
 † U. damzeni Wunderlich, 2000 
 † U. malinowskii Wunderlich, 2000

References

Halonoproctidae